Kusha was a Chandravamsha king. He was the father of Kushanaabha (who later became Rajarshi Kushanaabha).

References

Kshatriya
Lunar dynasty
Mahabharata